Ralph Brinkhaus (born 15 June 1968) is a German politician of the Christian Democratic Union (CDU). He served as parliamentary leader of the CDU/CSU group in the Bundestag from 2018 to 2022.

Education and early career
Brinkhaus was born on 15 June 1968 in Wiedenbrück, North Rhine-Westphalia, and grew up in Rietberg. After completing vocation training at Bosch and military services at Field Marshal Rommel Barracks, Augustdorf, he studied economics at the University of Hohenheim. He holds a degree in Economics and is a qualified tax advisor.

Early in his career, Brinkhaus worked at Deloitte in Hannover; Babcock Borsig in Oberhausen; as well as at Medion in Essen and Mülheim. In 2004, he eventually settled down as a tax adviser in Gütersloh.

Political career 
Brinkhaus was elected member of the city council of Gütersloh in 2004, a position he held until 2012. From 2004 to 2009 he was the party group leader. In 2004 he became a member of the executive committee of the CDU at district level.

Brinkhaus has been a member of the German Bundestag since the 2009 elections, succeeding Hubert Deittert. From 2009 until 2013, he served on the Finance Committee, where he was his parliamentary group’s rapporteur on banks and insurances. From 2014, he was part of the group’s leadership under chairman Volker Kauder. In this capacity, he was the group's main spokesman for budgetary and financial issues.

In addition to his committee assignments, Brinkhaus chaired the German-Indian Parliamentary Friendship Group from 2014 until 2017. He has since been serving as the group’s deputy chairman.

From 2016 to 2021, Brinkhaus also served as the deputy head of the CDU in North Rhine-Westphalia, Germany’s most populous state, under the leadership of chairman Armin Laschet. In the negotiations to form a coalition government under the leadership of Chancellor Angela Merkel following the 2017 federal elections, Brinkhaus was part of the CDU delegation.

Brinkhaus was elected CDU/CSU parliamentary group leader on 25 September 2018, with 125 votes from the parliamentary group members against incumbent Volker Kauder's 112 votes; at the time, the chairs of both CDU and CSU, Angela Merkel and Horst Seehofer, as well as Armin Laschet had already endorsed Kauder. Brinkhaus subsequently led the group with his co-chair from the CSU, Alexander Dobrindt.

Since 2022, Brinkhaus has been a member of the Committee on European Affairs and the Parliamentary Advisory Board on Sustainable Development.

Other activities
 Institut Finanzen und Steuern, Member of the Board of Trustees

Political positions
In June 2017, Brinkhaus voted against Germany’s introduction of same-sex marriage.

Personal life
Since 2010, Brinkhaus has been married to fellow economist and American Express manager Elke Tombach. He supports the 1. FC Köln football club.

References

External links 

Official website (in German)
Biography on the website of CDU/CSU in Bundestag (in German)
 his voting history and questions answered at abgeordnetenwatch (in German)
biography on the Bundestag pages (in German)

1968 births
Living people
Members of the Bundestag for North Rhine-Westphalia
Members of the Bundestag 2021–2025
Members of the Bundestag 2017–2021
Members of the Bundestag 2013–2017
Members of the Bundestag 2009–2013
Members of the Bundestag for the Christian Democratic Union of Germany